Hulsey Lake is a lake near Escudilla Peak in the Apache National Forest, Arizona. It is an impoundment of Hulsey Creek, a tributary of Nutrioso Creek. Due to snow and ice, the lake is usually inaccessible from November to mid-April.

Description

The area around the lake is heavily forested, and the tree line comes down to the shoreline. The Arizona Game and Fish Department stocks Hulsey Lake with rainbow trout in the spring and early summer. The lake gets weedy in summer months, and high pH levels prevent stocking as the season progresses. The lake frequently has a winter kill; there is typically no overwinter survival.

Fish species

 Rainbow Trout

References

External links
Arizona Boating Locations Facilities Map
Arizona Fishing Locations Map

Reservoirs in Apache County, Arizona
Apache-Sitgreaves National Forests